4 Regiment Army Air Corps is a regiment of the Army Air Corps (AAC).

History
 Detmold | 1964-1970 | 1, 23 & 24 Flights
 HQ at Detmold | 1971-1976 | 654 Squadron at Minden | 661 at Herford | 662 at Minden
 Detmold | 1977-1980 | 654 & 664
 Detmold | 1981-1983 | 654 & 664
 Detmold | 1983-1990 | 654, 659 & 669
 Deployed as part of the Gulf War with Lynx and Gazelle helicopter.
 Detmold | 1990-1994 | 654, 659 & 669
 Detmold | 1994-1995
 UK | 1995-present

Structure

The regiment consists of:
 No. 656 Squadron AAC
 No. 664 Squadron AAC

See also

 List of Army Air Corps aircraft units

References

Citations

Bibliography

Army Air Corps regiments
Military units and formations established in 1969